Kennedy Igboananike (born 26 February 1989) is a Nigerian professional footballer who plays as a striker for Swedish club IFK Haninge.

Career

Sweden
Igboananike began his career with Dynamos Football Academy. He joined Djurgårdens IF in 2007 but only played twice during his time at the club. He played his first game on 19 June 2007 against Hammarby IF. He moved on trial to IK Brage but was not signed. In January 2008 he was contracted with Vasalunds IF and went on to become the top scorer of the Division 1 Norra in 2008.

As of the 2010 season he returned to Djurgården. He scored in his comeback away against BK Häcken, when he equalized the score to 1–1 in the match which Djurgården ultimately lost 2–1. Igboananike was Djurgården's top scorer in the 2010 season, scoring nine goals in 27 games.

On 15 November 2012, Stockholm rivals AIK announced they had signed a three-year deal with Igboainanike. He got the number 21 jersey, because the number 7 was occupied by midfielder Helgi Daníelsson. During one of Kennedy's first games, against Gefle IF he scored a 96th-minute winner for his new club.

United States

Chicago Fire 
Igboananike signed with Chicago Fire SC of Major League Soccer on 2 December 2014 to a Designated Player contract. Igboananike scored his first goal for Chicago on 30 May 2015, in a 3–0 win against the Montreal Impact. His goal against the Philadelphia Union on 2 April 2016 lead to Chicago's first win in the 2016 season. He played with the Fire during the 2015 season and into the first half of the 2016 season.

D.C. United 
D.C. United acquired Igboananike on 29 July 2016 in an exchange with the Fire, trading targeted allocation money and a third-round pick in the 2019 MLS SuperDraft. Igboananike made his debut with his new club two days later in a 1–1 draw with Montreal Impact. He scored his only goal for D.C. United against Orlando City SC on October 23, 2016. He scored in the 77th minute, the goal was assisted by Julian Büscher and the game ended in a 2–4 defeat.

Igboananike's option was declined by United at the end of the 2016 season. His rights were then traded to Portland Timbers in exchange for a 2017 MLS SuperDraft pick. Igboananike played a total of seven league games for United, and scored only one goal.

Greece
On 7 February 2017, Igboananike joined Superleague Greece side Veria on a contract until the end of the 2016–17 season.

Return to Sweden
On 6 March 2017, only 1 month after he had signed for Veria, Igboananike signed for Swedish club Örebro on a free transfer.

Saudi Arabia
On 9 January 2019, Al-Hazm has signed Kennedy for one seasons from Örebro. He was left without a club on 1 July, 2019.

IK Sirius 
Igboananike joined Swedish club, IK Sirius on January 17, 2020.

In March 2021, Igboananike joined Tajikistan Higher League club Istiklol on trial.

IFK Mariehamn 
Following his trial with Istiklol, Igboananike signed for IFK Mariehamn on 19 March 2021.

IFK Haninge
On 15 March 2022, Igboananike returned to Sweden once again and signed with IFK Haninge in the third-tier Ettan Norra for the 2022 season, with an option to extend for 2023.

Career statistics
.

Honours
Individual
 Division 1 Norra Topscorer: 2008

References

External links
 
 
 Elite Prospects profile

1989 births
Living people
Nigerian footballers
Association football forwards
Djurgårdens IF Fotboll players
Vasalunds IF players
AIK Fotboll players
Chicago Fire FC players
D.C. United players
Veria F.C. players
Örebro SK players
Al-Hazem F.C. players
IK Sirius Fotboll players
Allsvenskan players
Superettan players
Ettan Fotboll players
Designated Players (MLS)
Major League Soccer players
Super League Greece players
Saudi Professional League players
Nigerian expatriate footballers
Expatriate footballers in Sweden
Expatriate soccer players in the United States
Expatriate footballers in Greece
Expatriate footballers in Saudi Arabia
Nigerian expatriate sportspeople in Sweden
Nigerian expatriate sportspeople in the United States
Nigerian expatriate sportspeople in Greece
Nigerian expatriate sportspeople in Saudi Arabia